Nitin Madane is representative for India in the sport of Kabaddi. He was a member of the kabaddi team that won a gold medal in the 2014 Asian Games in Incheon.

References

Living people
Indian kabaddi players
Asian Games medalists in kabaddi
Kabaddi players at the 2014 Asian Games
Year of birth missing (living people)
Asian Games gold medalists for India
Medalists at the 2014 Asian Games
Place of birth missing (living people)

Pro Kabaddi League players